"Never Can Say Goodbye" is a song written by Clifton Davis and originally recorded by The Jackson 5.

Never Can Say Goodbye may also refer to:
 Never Can Say Goodbye (Gloria Gaynor album), a 1975 album by Gloria Gaynor
 Never Can Say Goodbye: The Music of Michael Jackson, a 2010 album by American jazz organist Joey DeFrancesco

See also
Never Say Goodbye (disambiguation)